WMOC (88.7 FM) is a Christian radio station broadcasting a gospel music format. Licensed to Lumber City, Georgia, United States.  The station is currently owned by Full Gospel Church of God Written.

References

External links

MOC